Kuyuköy (also: Kuyu) is a village in the Merzifon District, Amasya Province, Turkey. Its population is 67 (2021).

References

Villages in Merzifon District